, pen name  was a Japanese manga artist.

He wrote many works that has been turned into anime, TV drama, and movie but is especially known for Anmitsuhime (あんみつ姫) which was turned into all three.  His second best known work, Tentenmusume (てんてん娘), was made into a movie on 1956 with Mariko Miyagi as the heroine and on 1984, it was made into a TV drama with Mayumi Hara in the same role.

References 

1914 births
1973 deaths
Manga artists from Yamanashi Prefecture
People from Kōfu, Yamanashi